The third season of Chuck was announced on May 17, 2009 with 13 episodes, with NBC reserving the option of nine more episodes. Production for the third season began on August 6, 2009. On October 28, 2009, NBC added 6 more episodes to the third season which brings the season total to 19. On November 19, NBC announced that Chuck would return mid-season on January 10 with two back-to-back episodes before it would move to Monday nights to its 8 pm time-slot on January 11.

Cast and characters

Main cast 
 Zachary Levi as Chuck Bartowski (19 episodes)
 Yvonne Strahovski as Sarah Walker (19 episodes)
 Joshua Gomez as Morgan Grimes (16 episodes)
 Ryan McPartlin as Devon Woodcomb (14 episodes)
 Mark Christopher Lawrence as Michael "Big Mike" Tucker (10 episodes)
 Scott Krinsky as Jeff Barnes (15 episodes)
 Vik Sahay as Lester Patel (15 episodes)
 Sarah Lancaster as Ellie Bartowski-Woodcomb (15 episodes)
 Adam Baldwin as Colonel John Casey (19 episodes)

Recurring cast 
 Bonita Friedericy as Diane Beckman (14 episodes)
 Brandon Routh as Daniel Shaw (11 episodes)
 Scott Holroyd as Justin Sullivan (5 episodes)
 Kristin Kreuk as Hannah (4 episodes)
 Scott Bakula as Stephen J. Bartowski (3 episodes)
 Mekenna Melvin as Alex McHugh (3 episodes)
 John Ott as Agent Carlson (3 episodes)

Notable guest stars
 Mark Sheppard as The Director (2 episodes)
 Mini Andén as Carina Miller (1 episode)
 Julia Ling as Anna Wu (1 episode)
 Tony Hale as Emmett Millbarge (1 episode)

Episodes

Reception

US Nielsen ratings

UK BARB ratings

Home media release

Notes

References

External links 
 
 

 
2010 American television seasons